The cabinet of Egyptian Prime Minister Hesham Qandil was sworn in on 2 August 2012. Qandil was appointed by President Mohamed Morsi, following the resignation of military-named premier Kamal Ganzouri. The cabinet consists of 36 ministers. The composition of the government is mostly formed by technocrats, with five Freedom and Justice Party (FJP) members and one member each from the Al-Wasat and Renaissance parties.

Reshuffles
On 12 August 2012, President Mohamed Morsi appointed Abdel Fattah el-Sisi as defense minister and Reda Hafez as military production minister.

On 17 November 2012, transport minister Mohammad Rashad Al Matini resigned over the Manfalut railway accident.

On 5 January 2013, a cabinet reshuffle took place replacing ten ministers. The number of FJP members in the cabinet increased from five to eight after the reshuffle.

On 7 May 2013, another reshuffle took place replacing nine ministers, increasing the number of FJP members to 10 out of a total of 36.

Resignations
On 1 July 2013, five cabinet members resigned together; they were tourism minister Hisham Zazou, communications and IT minister Atef Helmi, legal and parliamentary affairs minister Hatem Bagato, environment minister Khaled Abdel-Aal, and drinking water and sanitation facilities minister Abdel Khalifa. On 2 July 2013, foreign minister Mohamed Kamel Amr, petroleum minister Sherif Hadarra, and sports minister El Amry Farouk resigned. On 4 July 2013, one day after the 2013 Egyptian coup d'état, the Freedom and Justice Party announced nine ministers offered their resignations. The cabinet was dissolved on 8 July 2013 with the resignation of Prime Minister Hesham Qandil in protest over the killing of 61 protestors by the military at the Republican Guard headquarters.

Cabinet members

References

 
Cabinets of Egypt
2012 establishments in Egypt
Mohamed Morsi
2013 disestablishments in Egypt
Cabinets established in 2012
Cabinets disestablished in 2013